Ken Shutt (1928-April 2, 2010) was an American sculptor and watercolorist who was born in Long Beach, California.  He grew up in Whittier, California, and graduated from Pasadena City College, the Art Center College of Design and the Chouinard Art Institute.  He moved to Hawaii in 1963,  and lived there until 1995.  He returned to California in 1995, to be near his foundry, when he was commissioned to create a bronze sculpture for the entrance of Sea Life Park Hawaii.  He died 2010, at age 81, in Atascadero, California.

His best known paintings are watercolors of Hawaii's flora (see image).  His sculptures often combine such diverse materials as resin, wood, terrazzo, bronze, and granite.  The Honolulu Museum of Art and the Hawaii State Art Museum are among the public collections holding work by Ken Shutt. His sculptures in public places include:

A granite and bronze sculpture at the Kauai Performing Arts Center, Lihue, Hawaii.
Untitled 1976 sculpture, Leilehua High School, Honolulu, Hawaii 
Waialua, 1976, Waialua High and Intermediate School, Waialua, Hawaii
Konohiki, 1980-1981, King Intermediate School, Kaneohe, Hawaii
Celebrating the Arts, 1999, Kauaʻi Community College, Kauai, Hawaii
Heritage Growing, 1975, Laupahoehoe High and Elementary School, Laupahoehoe, Hawaii
Lanai Ohana, 1977, Lanai High and Elementary School, Lanai City, Hawaii
Kauai Ola, 1981, Kauai High School, Lihue, Hawaii
Hawaiian Porpoises, 1976, Honolulu Zoo, Honolulu, Hawaii
Family Structure, 1971, Kauikeaouli Hale (courthouse), Honolulu, Hawaii
Matrix, 1990, Hilo High School, Hilo, Hawaii
Four Valleys, 1978, Waianae High School, Waianae, Hawaii
Konohiki, 1973, Hawaii State Art Museum sculpture garden

References
Haar, Francis, Artists of Hawaii: Volume Two, University of Hawaii Press, Honolulu, 1977, pp. 74–78
Radford, Georgia and Warren Radford, Sculpture in the Sun, Hawaii's Art for Open Spaces, University of Hawaii Press, 1978, 76-77, 96

Footnotes

1928 births
2010 deaths
20th-century American sculptors
20th-century American male artists
21st-century American sculptors
21st-century American male artists
American male sculptors
Artists from Hawaii
People from Long Beach, California